Bourne is an electoral division of West Sussex in the United Kingdom, and returns one member to sit on West Sussex County Council. The former County Councillor, Mark Dunn, was also Chairman of West Sussex County Council. He lost his seat in 2013 to Sandra James of the United Kingdom Independence Party.

Extent
The division covers the villages of Chidham, Compton, East Marden, Forestside, Hambrook, North Marden, Nutbourne, Southbourne, Stoughton, Walderton, West Marden, Westbourne and Woodmancote; and the army base at Thorney Island.

It comprises the following Chichester District wards: the western part of Bosham Ward, the northern part of Funtington Ward, Southbourne Ward and Westbourne Ward; and of the following civil parishes: Chidham & Hambrook, Compton, Marden, Southbourne, Stoughton, West Thorney and Westbourne.

Election results

2013 Election
Results of the election held on 2 May 2013:

2009 Election
Results of the election held on 4 June 2009:

2005 Election
Results of the election held on 5 May 2005:

References
Election Results - West Sussex County Council

External links
 West Sussex County Council
 Election Maps

Electoral Divisions of West Sussex